Autism-friendly means being aware of social engagement and environmental factors affecting people on the autism spectrum, with modifications to communication methods and physical space to better suit individual's unique and special needs.

Overview 

Individuals on the autism spectrum take in information from their senses as do neurotypical (non-autistic) people. The difference is they are not able to process it in the same manner as their neurotypical peers and can become overwhelmed by the amount of information that they are receiving and withdraw as a coping mechanism. Additionally, it may be that an autistic person is actually taking in more sensory information and is merely overwhelmed by the sheer amount of input. As such, they may experience difficulty in public settings due to inhibited communication, social interaction or flexibility of thought development. Knowing about these differences and how to react effectively helps to create a more inclusive society. It also better suits the needs of individuals with autism spectrum disorders.

Being autism friendly means being understanding and flexible in interpersonal conversation, public programs and public settings. For example, a person might think that someone is being rude if they will not look them in the eyes or does not understand cliches like "it's a piece of cake", when in fact there may be a reason for this. Depending upon the individual's level of functioning, a person who hears "it's a piece of cake" may take that literally and not understand that what is really meant is "it will be easy". For someone on the autism spectrum, being in an autism-friendly environment means they will have a manageable degree of sensory stimuli, which will make them calmer, better able to process the sensory stimulation they receive, and better able to relate to others.

Communication and social interaction

Organizations interested in spreading awareness about autism and how to be autism friendly, such as The Autism Directory, have created training programs for communities to illustrate how people with autism may communicate or interact differently from neurotypical people, or people without autism. There are also suggestions for how to modify one's reaction to improve communication. Some training examples are:
 When one finds out that someone may not be able to look them in their eyes, one should realize that they are not trying to be rude, and it is uncomfortable for them to do so.
 A person may have difficulty understanding clichés or figurative expressions and interpret a phrase literally. By speaking directly and factually, like saying "It's easy" as compared to "It's a piece of cake", one is more likely to understand the line.
 Body language, facial expressions, gestures, and turning away from someone may be cues that are missed by an autistic person. This is another opportunity for one to be direct and factual, realizing that their body language or social cues may not be picked up.
 The person may have limited vocabulary or speech perception. Patience is helpful here. Allow time for the person to comprehend what was said. Ask how you can help. If they use sign language or a symbol set to communicate, adapt as you are able.

Other pointers are: avoid making loud sounds; do not surprise them, let them know your plans; limit or avoid vigorous activities; and talk or engage in activities that they care about.

Environment
Some people with autism may be hypersensitive to changes in sight, touch, smell, taste and sound; The sensory stimulus could be very distracting or they could result in pain or anxiety. There are other people who are hyposensitive and may not feel extreme changes in temperature or pain. Each of these has implications for making an autism-friendly environment.

Social factors
There are several factors in creating a supportive environment. One of them is adherence to a standard routine and structure. Since change of routine can be quite anxiety-producing for many autistic people, a structured, predictable routine makes for calmer and happier transitions during the day. Another important factor is creating a low-arousal space. Environments with the least amount of disruption will help autistic people remain calm. It is important to speak in quiet, non-disruptive tones and to use a physical space that has a low level of disruption. Having a positive, empathetic attitude and ensuring consistent habits in work, school and recreational activities also help to minimize anxiety and distress and help an autistic person succeed. This is the SPELL approach: StructurePositiveEmpathyLow arousalLinks. Social Stories can be used to communicate ways in which an autistic person can prepare themselves for social interaction.

Physical space

There are several ways that the physical space can be designed and organized to be autism friendly. It is important for rooms to be decorated with serenity in mind, like painting the walls with calming colors. Thick carpeting and double-paned glass help to minimize distracting noise (e.g. noise pollution). Materials within the rooms may be organized, grouped and labeled with words or symbols to make items easier to locate.

Topics

Daily life
Autism friendliness can have a significant impact on an individual's interpersonal life and work life, benefited by consistency across all areas of one's life.

Vacations
As the break of routine in family vacations causes distress to some autistic people, many families may avoid taking vacations. Steps can be taken to help make for a successful family vacation. One is sharing information like pictures or internet web pages. There are organizations that will make accommodations, if requested, to better manage common stressors such as uncertainty, crowds and noise disruption. This includes theme parks that allow people with autism to skip long lines and airlines or airports that may allow for a dry-run prior to the trip. Another tip is to prepare prior to the trip so that there is a plan for managing boredom.

Entertainment

Theatre
 
In the United States, the Theatre Development Fund (TDF) created a program in 2011 to "make theatre accessible to children and adults on the autism spectrum". Called the Autism Theatre Initiative, it is part of their Accessibility Programs, and was done in conjunction with Autism Speaks, Disney and experts who reviewed the performance for areas of modification. Adjustments that have been named for the initiative include: quiet areas in theatre lobby, performance changes that reduced strobe light use and noise, and areas where people can go perform an activity if they leave the theatre. Social stories, which explain what the experience will be like (such as loud noises, needing a break and moving through a crowd), were made available prior to the performance. These performances included Lion King and Mary Poppins.

On London's West End was the premiere of the first autism-friendly performance of Wicked, on 14 May 2016.

Movie cinema
Going to a movie theater can be an overwhelming experience for someone on the autism spectrum. Crowding as people queue up to buy tickets, loud movie volume, and dark theater lighting can all be sensory overload triggers that keep some autistic people from ever seeing movies at the cinema. Some movie theaters are becoming more autism friendly: the lighting is adjusted so it is not so dark, the volume is reduced and queues are managed to prevent crowding. Odeon Cinemas in London has implemented such "sensory-friendly" nights.

In the United States there are also "sensory-friendly" moviegoing experiences to be had through collaboration with the Autism Society of America. Monthly, AMC Theatres (AMC) will provide nights when people on the autism spectrum and their families may experience an autism-friendly movie night. The program is also intended for people with other disabilities whose moviegoing experience will also be improved in such a setting.

Santa Claus
In Canada, malls operated by Oxford Properties established a process by which autistic children could visit Santa Claus at the mall without having to contend with crowds. The malls open early to allow entry only to families with autistic children, who have a private visit with Santa Claus. In 2012, the Southcentre Mall in Calgary was the first mall to offer this service. The children are given a booklet explaining the process, and upon arrival at the mall are placed in a waiting area near Santa Claus before their visit "to ensure their comfort".

Education
Providing the best outcomes for a child on the autism spectrum may be difficult, complicated by each child's unique way of managing communication and interaction with others, associated disorders that make each child's situation unique, and emerging understandings of neurodiversity. Teacher effectiveness can be optimized based upon their awareness of the differences along the autism spectrum, acceptance that each child is unique, engagement of the child in social and educational activities and employment of teaching methods that are found to be helpful with people with developmental disability.

Teachers play a key role in the success of a student on the autism spectrum by helping them to understand directions, organize tasks and support their achievements. One example is organizing and grouping materials together for activities in specific ways.

Teachers give students with autism extra time to answer when they ask them a question. Children with autism take time to process information but they are listening and will respond.

Schools dedicated to being autism friendly, like Pathlight School in Singapore, designed their campus to offer students "dignity" in an autism-friendly environment. There the campus was architecturally designed, landscaped and the interior created with a simple color scheme. All of this helps to avoid triggering sensory overload. There is a high teacher to student ratio, a focus on nurturing, and a comprehensive life-skills training and education program.

In regards to students who show a significant delay in acquiring academic and verbal communication skills, a parent may want to look into an Applied Behavior Analysis (ABA)-style placement for their child. According to Autism Speaks, ABA can be defined as: behavior analysis focuses on the principles that explain how learning takes place. Positive reinforcement is one such principle. When a behavior is followed by some sort of reward, the behavior is more likely to be repeated. Through decades of research, the field of behavior analysis has developed many techniques for increasing useful behaviors and reducing those that may cause harm or interfere with learning. This is just one example of programming for students with ASD. However, ABA has been classed as abusive to autistics by the autistic community on many occasions and has led to many autistics developing PTSD.

Empathizing-systemizing theory
Empathizing-systemizing theory with video technology can be used to present information in an autism-friendly way that promotes understanding. For instance, computer applications or DVDs of actors making facial expressions to inform how body language provides clues about how someone might be feeling. Or, in the case of The Transporters, interesting items like trains are used to wear faces, drawing in the viewer into the faces.

Justice and law
Being met with an individual in a dark uniform can be intimidating to a person with autism, particularly when they have been a crime victim or are injured. Police and emergency responders may become frustrated, not knowing a person that they are talking to is autistic. The responders may not be communicating in a way that will create understanding and make the situation less stressful. A program has been launched in London, Ontario, Canada to enter information into a database about autistic people so that responding police and emergency personnel are notified when they will be meeting an autistic person and may then communicate in a way that increases understanding and makes the situation less stressful. Autism Alert Cards, for example, are available for autistic people in London, England, UK so that police and emergency personnel will recognize autistic individuals and respond appropriately. The cards, which encourage autism-friendly interaction, have a couple of key points about interacting with people with autism.

Life events
"Neurotypical" people and those on the autism spectrum may have very different ways of communicating their feelings about life events, including:
 Coping with illness, injury and recuperation
 Dealing with dying and death
 Incorporating rituals and traditions for managing life events
 Managing emotions
 Learning from life events

Just because people may process and communicate their feelings differently, though, does not mean it is right or wrong. It is best to be honest and literal to help a person with autism to manage major life events. Providing information, and allowing them time to process it, are other important factors. Lastly, communication tools will also help to process and manage the event.

People on the autism spectrum can help themselves manage situations by being aware of what they are feeling and thinking — and expressing their thoughts to important people in their life. Other tools are being aware of when they need help and asking for it — and thanking people when they have received assistance or a gift.

Technology
Educational technological applications for people with autism include:

Digital talking books
Digital talking books are used to assist people with disabilities, commonly people who are blind, and also for people with autism. One such use is for taped church programs.

Mobile applications
 One of the providers of autism-friendly applications is iPad, which was an interface between the child and the storyteller on a video. By repeating what the narrator says, the children hear themselves tell the story, like Tom the Talking Cat. Reading the stories aloud helps children improve their language and communication skills, as well as improving fine motor skills, social skills and sensory skills.<ref>"iPad Apps That Help Autistic Children's Development." Huffington Post. November 17, 2011.</ref>
 Apple iPod applications can be used by people on the autism spectrum to manage tasks at work. It can manage a checklist of tasks and reminder prompts. This helps a person be more calm and effective and rely less on managers or job coaches to prompt for needed work. Tony Gentry, who led research on the application at Virginia Commonwealth University said: "This is an exciting time for anyone in the fields of education, physical rehabilitation, and vocational support, where we are seeing a long-awaited merging of consumer products and assistive technologies for all."

Motion-controlled gadgets

Social media

Types of technology
 Emotion Markup Language is a general-purpose emotion annotation and representation language, which should be usable in a large variety of technological contexts where emotions need to be represented. Emotion-oriented computing (or "affective computing") is gaining importance as interactive technological systems become more sophisticated. For people on the autism spectrum, it can be used to make the emotional intent of content explicit. This would enable people with learning disabilities (such as autism spectrum disorders) to realise the emotional context of the content.

Training for businesses
As the prevalence of autism increases, it becomes increasingly important to ensure that customer-facing organizations have basic tools for communicating with people on the autism spectrum. Tesco, a multinational supermarket chain, has implemented training for its employees to meet the needs of its customers who are on the autism spectrum, which is estimated to be one of every 100 people in the United Kingdom. Employees use an online training site and respond to a questionnaire to assess the extent to which they became more aware of autism spectrum disorders (ASD). Tesco is the first company to participate in an awareness program led by the Welsh Local Government Association (WLGA). The online training and questionnaire tool is intended to be used by many organizations in Wales to identify and commend businesses that are "ASD Aware".

The SERVICE principles have been developed to guide businesses in making no-cost or low-cost changes to their premises and practices. The principles address common challenges that people on the autism spectrum face when they are out in the community. By applying as many principles as possible, businesses can address the most frequently occurring challenges reported by people living with autism. Corrimal, New South Wales, Australia is working towards being the first autism-friendly community in Australia.

Recreational facilities

Inclusive recreation
Inclusive recreation, also called adaptive recreation

 Community involvement 

Organizations or programs that promote autism-friendly efforts are:
 Autism Awareness Campaign UK
 The Autism Directory in England awards an "Autism Friendly" mark to those companies that undergo The Autism Directory's free autism awareness training. It shows that this particular company has a basic awareness of autism and acts as a good indicator to any potential autistic customers
 Autism Research Institute (US)
 National Autistic Society (UK)
 https://autismfriendlycharter.org.au/ The Autism Friendly Charter is a free online learning platform and inclusive business directory that was developed in partnership with individuals on the autism spectrum and their families to assist businesses, organisations and venues to build understanding, awareness, inclusivity and capacity of the autism spectrum.

 Autism rights movement 

There is some effort in the autism community on raising awareness among society, but the very nature of autism can make self-promotion difficult for autistic people.

The autism rights movement encourages autistic people to "embrace their neurodiversity" and encourages society to accept autistics as they are. The movement advocates giving children more tools to cope with the non-autistic world instead of trying to change them into neurotypicals, and says society should learn to tolerate harmless behaviours such as tics and stims like hand-flapping or humming. Autism rights activists say that "tics, like repetitive rocking and violent outbursts" can be managed if others make an effort to understand autistic people, while other autistic traits, "like difficulty with eye contact, with grasping humor or with breaking from routines", would not require corrective efforts if others were more tolerant.

Many people disagree with the aims of the autism rights movement, saying that the movement overstates the gifts associated with autism and may thereby jeopardize funding for research and treatment. Additionally, many parents of autistic children say that the notion of "positive living with autism" has little relevance to them and that autism rights are for "the high-functioning autistics and Aspies who make up the bulk of the movement". Many also say that behavioral therapies provide help in caring for children who are sometimes aggressive and that autism exacts a toll on the entire family.

Autistic pride
Autistic pride refers to pride in autism and shifting views of autism from "disease" to "difference". Autistic pride emphasizes the innate potential in all human phenotypic expressions and celebrates the diversity various neurological types express.

Autistic pride asserts that autistic people are not sick; rather, they have a unique set of characteristics that provide them many rewards and challenges, not unlike their non-autistic peers.

 See also 
 Universal design
 Sensory friendly

 References 

 Further reading 
 Bishop, Beverly (author) and Craig Bishop (Illustrator). (2011). My Friend with Autism: Enhanced Edition with FREE CD of Coloring Pages! Future Horizons. .
 Beadle-Brown J., Roberts R. and Mills R. (2009). "Person-centred approaches to supporting children and adults with autism spectrum disorders." Tizard Learning Disability Review. 14:(3). pp. 18–26. It is available from the National Autistic Society (NAS) Information Centre, UK
 Fahrety, Catherine (author) and Gary B. Mesibov, Ph.D. (contributor). (2008). Understanding Death and Illness and What They Teach about Life: An Interactive Guide for Individuals with Autism or Asperger's and Their Loved Ones. Future Horizons. .
 Mills, R. (Winter 1999). "Q & A: SPELL." Communication. pp. 27–28. It is available from the National Autistic Society (NAS) Information Centre, UK.
 Povey C. (2009). "Commentary on person-centred approaches to supporting children and adults with autism spectrum disorders." Tizard Learning Disability Review.'' 14:(3). pp. 27–29. It is available from the National Autistic Society (NAS) Information Centre, UK.

External links 
 Autism Awareness presentation or training material
 Autism Awareness Training Presentation
 Introduction to ASD.
 Aspergers
 List of Asperger Traits
 Asperger: female traits, differences between male and female traits
 Other information
 Book reviews for iPad applications for autism and Aspergers syndrome.
 Autism Tips & Helps in areas of potty training, coping through meltdowns, and sensory issues

Autism rights movement
Accessibility
Disability accommodations
Sensory accommodations